Michael Jeffrey Sullivan (born November 14, 1963 in Queens, New York) is an American former handball player who competed in the 1988 Summer Olympics.

References

1963 births
Living people
American male handball players
Olympic handball players of the United States
Handball players at the 1988 Summer Olympics
Medalists at the 1987 Pan American Games
Pan American Games gold medalists for the United States
Pan American Games medalists in handball